The Lewiston-Porter Sentinel is an American, English language weekly newspaper published on Saturdays, primarily serving the town of Lewiston in Niagara County, New York. The newspaper has been published continuously since 1987. The Sentinel is a newspaper of public record for Niagara County, and along with Niagara Gazette is one of the official town newspapers of Lewiston. The paper is published by Niagara Frontier Publications under publisher Skip Mazenauer. It has a circulation of 10,750.

History 
The newspaper's first issue was published on February 14, 1987, the masthead reading "WE NEED A NAME!" and was originally published monthly. The name Lewiston-Porter Sentinel was chosen from among suggestions made by readers, and appeared in the masthead for the first time with the second issue on March 14, 1987. The newspaper changed from monthly to weekly frequency on October 3, 1992.

Awards 
In June 2017, the staff of the Lewiston-Porter Sentinel were honored by New York State Senator Robert G. Ortt with a certificate of recognition "for 30 years of business and service to the River Region." The newspaper was also the subject of a 2017 proclamation by Assembly member Anthony J. Morinello. In March 2017, Niagara County Legislator Clyde L. Burmaster recognized the publishers, editor-in-chief, and editor of the Lewiston-Porter Sentinel "for the positive impact it has had in the community for the past 30 years."  Niagara Frontier Publications has received numerous other community and small business awards throughout its history.

References

Newspapers published in New York (state)
Lewiston (town), New York
Newspapers established in 1987
1987 establishments in New York (state)